Jack Whyte (March 15, 1940February 22, 2021) was a Scottish-Canadian novelist of historical fiction. Born and raised in Scotland, he moved to Canada in 1967. He resided in Kelowna, British Columbia.

Early life
Whyte was born in Scotland on March 15, 1940.  He resided there until relocating to Canada in 1967.  He was employed at a local school for one year, where he taught English.  He subsequently worked as an author, musician, and actor.  He and his wife, Beverley, initially lived in Alberta before settling in Kelowna in 1996.

Writings
Whyte's major work was a series of historical novels retelling the story of King Arthur against the backdrop of Roman Britain. This version of the popular legend eschews the use of magic to explain Arthur's ascent to power and instead relies on the historical condition (with some artistic licence) of post-Roman Britain to support the theory that Arthur was meant to counter the anarchy left by the Roman departure from Britain in 410 AD and the subsequent colonization and invasion of Britain by various peoples from Northwestern Europe, including the Saxons, Jutes, Franks, and Angles. Whyte incorporates traditional Arthurian names, places and events (albeit in Gaelic or Latin form) as well as the names of various historical figures that have been suggested as being the possible basis for the original King Arthur legend. The tacit implication is that Whyte's version of history is the true story that has become distorted over time to become the legend and stories of magic that we know today. The series has been published in different locations under three different titles. In Canada it was titled A Dream of Eagles, while in the United States it was retitled The Camulod Chronicles.  When it was eventually republished in Great Britain with a different reading order, it became Legends of Camelot.

Whyte served as the official bard of The Calgary Highlanders and performed several tracks of poetry and song on the 1990 recording by the Regimental Pipes and Drums of The Calgary Highlanders entitled Eighty Years of Glory: The Regimental Pipes, Drums and Bard of The Calgary Highlanders.

Camulod Chronicles

A Dream of Eagles (Camulod Chronicles or Legends of Camelot)
The Skystone  (published in Great Britain as War of the Celts)
The Singing Sword  (published in Great Britain as The Round Table)
The Eagles' Brood  (published in Great Britain as Merlyn)
The Saxon Shore  (published in Great Britain as Excalibur)
The Sorcerer Part 1: The Fort at River's Bend  (published in Great Britain as The Boy King)
The Sorcerer Part 2: Metamorphosis  (published in Great Britain as The Sorcerer)
Uther  (published in Great Britain as Pendragon)

The two volumes The Sorcerer: The Fort at River's Bend and The Sorcerer: Metamorphosis were written as a single volume entitled The Sorcerer, but were split for publication.

A Dream of Eagles Prequel 
The Burning Stone

Golden Eagle (companion mini-series)
Clothar the Frank  (published as The Lance Thrower in the United States of America, and as Lancelot in Great Britain)
The Eagle  (published as The Last Stand in Great Britain)

Other
Uther (published as Pendragon in Great Britain) is a stand-alone novel about the life of Uther Pendragon from infancy up until the end of events in The Eagles' Brood. It serves to answer questions left open by The Eagles' Brood that result from the fact that the latter is told exclusively from the perspective of Merlyn Britannicus and as such is not able to explain actions and events of which Merlyn is unaware.  Uther is also a companion novel to The Eagles' Brood, as it follows the title character and others as they grow up and wage war on Uther's main enemy, Guhlrys Lot, King of Cornwall.

The Templar Trilogy
Knights of the Black and White (released August 1, 2006, in Canada) 
Standard of Honor (released August 28, 2007, in Canada) 
Order in Chaos (released in August 2009)

The Guardians of Scotland 
 The Forest Laird (2010) 
 The Renegade (2012)  (published as Robert the Bruce in the United States in 2013)
 The Guardian (2014)

Short fiction 
Though primarily a novelist, Whyte has also written and published at least one short story:
 "Power Play" in Paradox Magazine, issue 8 (Winter 2005–2006), an exploration of the nature of power, set in Roman Jerusalem.

Later life
Although Whyte received letters from readers around the world, he lived in obscurity in Kelowna.  He died on the night of February 22, 2021, at Kelowna Hospice House.  He was 80, and suffered from cancer prior to his death.

References

Further reading
A Way with Words in Okanagan Life Magazine (includes a profile of Whyte)

External links
Official website for Jack Whyte.  Includes biography, bibliography, book excerpts, radio interview transcripts, and an active fan forum.
.  Includes questions by readers and Whyte's answers to those questions, as well as general observations by Whyte.
Jack Whyte: one pen, one sword, one million sold Feature article about Jack Whyte published in The Globe and Mail, Sept 2, 2009
 Jack Whyte at Fantasy Literature

1940 births
2021 deaths

Canadian historical novelists
Writers of historical fiction set in the Middle Ages
Scottish emigrants to Canada
Canadian male novelists
Canadian fantasy writers
Scottish fantasy writers
Writers of modern Arthurian fiction
People from Johnstone
People from Kelowna
Writers from British Columbia
20th-century Canadian novelists
21st-century Canadian novelists
Scottish novelists